Joseph Vincent McGee (born 6 March 1993) is an English footballer who plays  as a midfielder.

Career
McGee was born in Wigan. He signed a two-year scholarship in the summer of 2009. He made his debut for Morecambe on 21 April 2012, in a 3–2 defeat to Rotherham United coming on as a second-half substitute for Niall Cowperthwaite A few days after it was announced that he was to be out of action for 9 months with a cruciate ligament injury, Joe McGee was released by Morecambe along with three others on 6 May 2014. Joe McGee joined Buxton but did not make a single first team appearance for them and ending up joining Workington FC on a free transfer on a one-year contract for the 2015/16 season.
2020/21 Season McGee signed for Parthenope in SW London and is now into his second season with the club.

Personal life
In 2018 he graduated from the University of Salford with a first class degree in Physiotherapy.

References

External links

1993 births
Living people
English footballers
Footballers from Wigan
Association football midfielders
Morecambe F.C. players
Workington A.F.C. players
English Football League players
Buxton F.C. players
Alumni of the University of Salford